Associação Desportiva Oliveirense is a Portuguese sports club from Santa Maria de Oliveira, Vila Nova de Famalicão.

The men's football team played several years on the third tier, and was supposed to contest the 2020–21 Campeonato de Portugal. However they filed for bankruptcy and was denied a license. Vilaverdense was invited as third-place finishers in AF Braga's District League and accepted the invitation. AD Oliveirense subsequently played in AF Braga's II Série C.

References

Football clubs in Portugal
Association football clubs established in 1952
1952 establishments in Portugal
Sport in Vila Nova de Famalicão